Irenäus Eibl-Eibesfeldt (15 June 1928 – 2 June 2018) was an Austrian ethologist in the field of human ethology. In authoring the book which bears that title, he applied ethology to humans by studying them in a perspective more common to volumes studying animal behavior.

Education and work 
Born in Vienna, Austria, Eibl-Eibesfeldt studied zoology at the University of Vienna from 1945 to 1949. From 1946 to 1948 he was research associate at the Biological Station Wilhelminenberg near Vienna and became a research associate of the Institute for Comparative Behavior Studies in Altenberg near Vienna with Konrad Lorenz in 1949. Between 1951 and 1969 he worked at the Max Planck Institute for Behavioral Physiology (first in Westphalia, from 1957 at Seewiesen, Bavaria). In 1970 he became Professor for Zoology at the University of Munich. From 1975 he was the head of the Max Planck Institute for Behavioral Physiology, Department of Human Ethology in Andechs, Germany. He was the co-founder and first president of the International Society for Human Ethology. From 1992 he was Honorary Director of the Ludwig-Boltzmann-Institute for Urban Ethology in Vienna.

In the first 20 years of his work as an animal ethologist, he investigated experimentally and descriptively the development of behavior of mammals and compared the behavior of communication of vertebrates. He was the author of many books such as Love and Hate: The Natural History of Behavior Patterns and Human Ethology.

Personal life
He married Eleonore Eibl-Eibesfeldt in 1950.  They had two children, Bernolf and Roswitha.

Eibl-Eibesfeldt died on 2 June 2018 in Starnberg, two weeks before his 90th birthday.

For many years he dived with Hans Hass on his diving boat Xarifa.

Decorations and awards
 1971 Gold Medal of the cosmos Bölsche Society for Services to the dissemination of scientific knowledge
 1981 Burda Prize for Communication Research
 1988 Philip Morris Research Prize
 1989 Gold Honorary Medal of Vienna
 1994 Honorary Doctorate of Philosophy at the University of Salamanca, Spain
 1995 Great Cross of Merit of the Federal Republic of Germany
 1996 National Park bubble in gold with rubies and diamonds for exceptional service to the international nature protection conferred by the Natural History Museum of Vienna and the Danube-Auen National Park Academy
 1996 Schwenk'scher Environmental Award of Ebersberg
 1997 Gold Medal of the Drs Haackert Foundation, awarded for outstanding contributions to the study of human behaviour
 1997 Bavarian Order of Merit
 1997 years prize of the Foundation for Western consciousness (STAB) from Zurich
 1998 Austrian Cross of Honour for Science and Art, 1st class
 1998 Inge and Werner Grüter Award for successful science communication for services to the marine biology and Riffforschung
 1999 "Premio Catedra Santiago Grisolía" for contributions to the study of the ethology of the people and the aggressiveness
 1999 "Al mérito" awarded by the Charles Darwin Foundation, Ecuador
 2001 Honorary award from the Heinz Foundation Sielmann for use for conservation, especially in the Galapagos Islands
 2003 Gold Medal for services to the City of Vienna
 2005 Honorary Doctorate of Psychology at the University of Bologna, Italy

See also
:Category:Taxa named by Irenäus Eibl-Eibesfeldt

References

External links
Eibl-Eibesfeldt's homepage
Biography
International Society for Human Ethology
 Homepage of lecture for Human Ethology at the University Innsbruck several PDF-documents in English

1928 births
2018 deaths
Austrian underwater divers
Austrian zoologists
Commanders Crosses of the Order of Merit of the Federal Republic of Germany
Recipients of the Austrian Cross of Honour for Science and Art, 1st class
Ethologists
Academic staff of the Ludwig Maximilian University of Munich
Scientists from Vienna
University of Vienna alumni
Members of the European Academy of Sciences and Arts
Max Planck Institute directors